Haplopseustis is a monotypic moth genus of the family Noctuidae. Its only species, Haplopseustis erythrias, is found in Australia where it has been found in the Northern Territory and
Queensland. Both the genus and species were first described by Edward Meyrick in 1902.

References

Acontiinae
Monotypic moth genera